Guy Cheron (born 1 July 1955) is a professor of neurophysiology and movement biomechanics. He works at the Faculty of Motor Science in the Université Libre de Bruxelles and is a professor of neuropsychology at the Faculty of Psychology and Education Sciences in the University of Mons. He is the co-founder of the spinoff Human Waves.

Training 
Born in Halle, Belgium, Guy obtained a MS degree in motor sciences and his PhD under the supervision of Prof. JE Desmedt at the Brain Research Unit of the Université Libre de Bruxelles where he defended an Aggregation Thesis in Neuroscience. He was visiting professor (OTAN-fellow) at the Department of Engineering of the University of California, Berkeley. Thereafter he joined the University of Mons as Assistant Professor before becoming head of the Laboratory of Neurophysiology and Movement Biomechanics at the Université Libre de Bruxelles in 1992.

Expertise 
He is a neurophysiologist author or co-author of more than 200 papers in international journals, and one book. In 1986, he has discovered, together with E. Godaux, the localization of the oculomotor neural integrator (NI) in the nucleus prepositus of the cat. The NI is the neural structure responsible of the gaze holding. This discovery demonstrated for the first time the biological recognition that a brainstem neural network is able to perform mathematical integration. From 1986 to 1997, he revealed the physiological properties of the NI. During the last 20 years, he worked conjunctly in mouse and human neurophysiology. He was also the first to demonstrate since 2004 the emergence of 160–200 Hz oscillation in the cerebellum of different mouse models presenting neurological diseases ranging from cerebellar ataxia, Angelman syndrome, FAS and Steinert disease. He also actively participate to numerous neuroscience space experiences realized on board of the International Space Station (NeuroCog, NeuroSpat, and Adriadna ESA missions) where his group demonstrated with EEG dynamics the alteration of top-down signals in visual perception in weightlessness environment. This neurophysiological expertise was also applied in the field of non-invasive BCI (Mindwalker, FP7 project) and in the search of the cerebral oscillations linked to the psychological flow in the top performance.

Scientific societies, international scientific commissions, and editorial assignments 
He is active member of the European Neuroscience Association, the Society for Neuroscience, the American Association for the Advancement of Science

He is specialty Chief Editor at Frontiers in Psychology, Movement Sciences and Sport Psychology and a guest editor in Frontiers in Neuroscience (Topics Neurology) and of Diseases, Section Neuro-Psychiatric Disorders, and member of the editorial boards of Scientific World JOURNAL, Open Journal of Neuroscience,  Brain Sciences, and Neural Plasticity.

He also reviewed articles for around 50 international research journals including: J. Neurophysiol.- J. Neurosci.- Brain. - J. Physiol. (Lond) - Neuroscience - NeuroImage.- PlosOne - Cerebral Cortex.- Nature Communication- Hum. Brain Mapp-Scientific Reports.

Honours and awards 
 Officer of the Order of Leopold II for outstanding research activities
 Prix de Biomécanique, Paris, 1987
 Prix MAAF Santé, Montréal, 2000.
 Prix Science & Innovation, 2015, Comité Olympique Interfédéral Belge.

Bibliography

References 

Living people
1955 births
People from Halle, Belgium
Belgian neuroscientists
Academic staff of Vrije Universiteit Brussel
Recipients of the Order of Leopold II